The Lahaula are a tribal community found in Lahaul and Spiti district of Himachal Pradesh.Lahaule tribes of Himachal Pradesh are of mixed origination and are the inhabitants of Lahaul.
Mostly this Lahaule tribal community is found in several regions like Lahaul Valley, Pattan, Chamba-Lahaul, and lower Mayar valleys.
The term ‘Lahule’ connotes the inhabitants of Lahaul. This tribal people are said to be originated from the aboriginal Munda tribe and Tibetans.
The language of the Lahaule tribal community is In fact there are alternative names of this language, which are popular amongst the Lahaule tribal community.
Manchati, Manchad, Patni, Chamba, Chamba Lahuli, Lahuli, Swangla, Changsapa Boli are some of the alternative names of their language. Apart from these, there are certain dialects of this language, which are also prevalent in Lahaule tribal groups.
Though the people of the Lahaule tribal community are basically agrarian, some of them are also engaged in trade. They export wheat, barley, ‘Kuth’ which is a herb, to Kolcuta.
Their society is ramified in upper and lower classes namely Brahmins, Thakurs, Lohars and Dagis.
Marriage in the same clan is allowed among the Lahaule tribal community. Just like many other tribal communities of the whole of the Indian subcontinent, this Lahaule tribal community too is oriented to religious customs and beliefs.
Most of the people of this community are the followers of Hinduism and Buddhism. Hindu and Buddhist visit Trilokinath temple often.
These people prefer to wear colourful attires and ornaments which are a major part of their costumes. That the culture and the tradition of this Lahaule tribal community are quite exquisite is revealed from the fact that it has a plethora of dance forms, music, fairs and festivals.

Social status
, the Lahaula were classified as a Scheduled Tribe under the Indian government's reservation program of positive discrimination.

References

Scheduled Tribes of Himachal Pradesh